Clifton Park Valve House, also known as the Lake Clifton Gate House or Lake Clifton Valve House, is a historic building located in a northeast area known as Clifton Park of Baltimore, Maryland. It is a massive octagonal stone gatehouse featuring large Romanesque archways that alternate with Gothic style windows that once contained stained glass. It was constructed in 1887 by the Baltimore City Water Department. It also features a turret, atop an intricate tile roof supported by a complicated system of iron trusses.

Clifton Park Valve House was listed on the National Register of Historic Places in 1971. In 2014, Preservation Maryland placed Clifton Park Valve House on its list of threatened historic properties.

References

External links
, including undated photo, at Maryland Historical Trust
Explore Baltimore Heritage - Clifton Park Valve House

Belair-Edison, Baltimore
Buildings and structures in Baltimore
Government buildings on the National Register of Historic Places in Baltimore
Gatehouses (waterworks)
Water supply infrastructure on the National Register of Historic Places
Infrastructure completed in 1887